This is a disambiguation page. The Ulster Senior League may refer to:

 Ulster Senior League (association football)
 Ulster Senior League (men's hockey) 
 Ulster Senior League (rugby union)   
 Ulster Senior Club Football League - Gaelic football  
 Ulster Senior Club Hurling League